Vladislav Sekal (born 18 January 1930) is a Czech wrestler. He competed in two events at the 1952 Summer Olympics.

References

External links
 

1930 births
Possibly living people
Czech male sport wrestlers
Olympic wrestlers of Czechoslovakia
Wrestlers at the 1952 Summer Olympics
People from Tábor
Sportspeople from the South Bohemian Region